Ptolemy's Gate is a novel of alternate history, fantasy and magic. It is the third book in the Bartimaeus trilogy, written by British author Jonathan Stroud. It was released in the United Kingdom in September 2005, and in the United States in December of the same year.

Synopsis
Three years have passed since the magician Nathaniel (otherwise known as John Mandrake) helped prevent an attack on London that would have been cataclysmic for its magicians and commoners. Now an established member of the British Government, he faces unprecedented problems: foreign wars are going badly, Britain's enemies are mounting attacks close to London, and rebellion is fomenting among the commoners. Increasingly distracted with other affairs, Nathaniel is treating Bartimaeus worse than ever.

Setting
Set in an alternate version of London, England. The year is approximately 2011, as the book takes place three years after The Golem's Eye, which was estimated to take place in 2008 due to the timing of Gladstone's death.

Magical objects, spells and places
Ptolemy's Gate - a kind of reverse summoning, a method that allows a human to enter the 'other place' where spirits dwell

Principal characters

Magicians
Nathaniel/John Mandrake
Ptolemy
Jessica Whitwell
Jane Farrar
Quentin Makepeace
Harold Button
Sholto Pinn
Carl Mortensen
Helen Malbindi
Clive Jenkins
Rebecca Piper
Bruce Collins

Commoners
Kitty Jones
Clem Hopkins
Nicholas Drew
George Fox
Rosanna Lutyens

Spirits
Bartimaeus, a fourth level djinn in service to Nathaniel
Ascobol
Cormocodran
Mwamba
Hodge
Faquarl
Nouda
Purip
Fritang

Plot summary
The British Empire is falling apart.  Many commoners are unhappy with the current government, though none of the commoners claim responsibility for the status quo. The magician's demons are being assaulted by the children's natural abilities to see and resist the demons.  Some commoners advocate slow reform, while others advocate open revolt, while still others say the commoners should learn how to summon spirits of their own to combat those spirits belonging to the magicians.  Ptolemy's Gate concludes with a council of surviving magicians and important commoners trying to work out a government that is beneficial to everyone.

Kitty Jones eventually unearths the reason why humans and spirits are locked into the endless cycle, that humans do not understand the nature of djinni and summon them only as powerful, but dangerous, slaves, not equals.  This theory is confirmed by Bartimaeus who states that his greatest master, Ptolemy, was the only human who treated his servants as equals and tried to build a bridge between djinni and humans.  However, Ptolemy misguidedly believed many others would follow in his footsteps.

England's domestic turmoil has taken its toll on John Mandrake.  Mandrake is friendless and constantly watched by his numerous enemies.  In the three years since The Golem's Eye, there have been several attempts on Mandrake's life.  His years as a high-ranking government official have made Mandrake merciless, and he treats all of his servants cruelly, especially Bartimaeus.  However, events in Ptolemy's Gate shatter Mandrake's confidence in what he has become.  The transformation from Mandrake to Nathaniel is much more rapid than the one from Nathaniel to Mandrake.  Nathaniel drops the name John Mandrake altogether, as well as the fear of others knowing his true name, humbly telling it to Kitty, with whom he seems to have struck up a newfound friendship, and boldly proclaiming it to the spirit Nouda.  With the end of Mandrake, Nathaniel becomes all that Ptolemy hoped to be.  Nathaniel willingly allows Bartimaeus to share his body to combat Nouda and his army of hybrids, using Gladstone's staff, a fusion that forever bridges the gap between humans and djinn. However, at the last moment, he dismisses Bartimaeus and then sacrifices himself to destroy the spirit Nouda. This incident was similar to what Ptolemy did in the moments before he died.

Reception
Ptolemy's Gate has received the following accolades:

 Starred Kirkus review (2006)
 Starred Booklist review (2006)
 Cybils Award (Speculative Fiction) (2006)
 Locus Award for Best Young Adult Novel (2006)
 Corine Internationaler Buchpreis for Kinder- und Jugendbuch (2006)
 American Library Association's (ALA) Selected Audiobooks for Young Adults (2007)
 ALA's Notable Children's Recordings (2007)

References

Bartimaeus Sequence
2005 British novels
Children's fantasy novels
British children's novels
Novels set in London
Doubleday (publisher) books
2005 children's books
Novels about spirit possession
Novels about revolutions